Events from the year 1606 in Sweden

Incumbents
 Monarch – Charles IX

Events
 March - The Riksdag of the Estates is summoned to Örebro. The main topic is the claim to the Swedish throne from the Polish monarch Sigismund III Vasa and the counter reformation which his accession is feared to signify. 
 - Foundation of the city of Vaasa in Finland.  
 - Prince John is appointed Duke of Östergötland.

Births
 - Erik Gabrielsson Emporagrius, professor and bishop   (born 1674) 
 - Arvid Wittenberg, count, field marshal and privy councillor  (died 1657)

Deaths

References

 
Years of the 17th century in Sweden
Sweden